Paul S. Berliner is an American who formerly worked as a trader associated with the brokerage firm Schottenfeld Group.  In April 2008 he was simultaneously charged by/settled with the U.S. Securities and Exchange Commission for allegedly spreading a rumor designed to lower the stock price of Alliance Data Systems  Berliner allegedly had sold short borrowed stock of Alliance Data Systems, hoping to profit by repurchasing the stock when the price fell. He settled the charges without admitting or denying any wrongdoing by disgorging profits, paying a fine, and agreeing to a permanent bar from associating with any broker or dealer.

References

Living people
Year of birth missing (living people)